Vern Albert McKee (April 28, 1930 – December 10, 2004) an American football and baseball player and coach. He spent two seasons playing Minor League Baseball the St. Louis Browns organization before embarking on a career in coaching and scouting. McKee served as the head football coach at Yankton College from 1960 to 1962 and Huron University from 1992 to 1993, compiling a career college football coaching record of 13–30–1. He was also the head baseball coach at North Dakota State University from 1964 to 1965, tallying a mark of 21–26.

Head coaching record

College football

References

External links
 

1930 births
2004 deaths
Fort Smith Twins players
Huron Screaming Eagles football coaches
Huron Screaming Eagles football players
Huron Screaming Eagles men's basketball players
North Dakota State Bison football coaches
North Dakota State Bison baseball coaches
South Dakota Coyotes baseball coaches
South Dakota Coyotes football coaches
South Dakota Coyotes men's basketball coaches
Topeka Owls players
Yankton Greyhounds baseball coaches
Yankton Greyhounds football coaches
Yankton Greyhounds men's basketball coaches
College men's track and field athletes in the United States
High school football coaches in South Dakota
People from Huron, South Dakota
People from Browns Valley, Minnesota
Players of American football from South Dakota
Baseball players from South Dakota
Basketball coaches from South Dakota
Basketball players from South Dakota